Mahrızlı (also, Makhryzly and Mekhrizli) is a village in the Agdam Rayon of Azerbaijan.  The village forms part of the municipality of Zəngişalı.

References 

Populated places in Aghdam District